This is a list of the Philippines national football team results from 2000 to 2009.

2000

2001

2002

2004

2006

2007

2008

2009

Notes

References

2000s in the Philippines
2000-2009